Nonia exiguella is a species of snout moth, and the type species in the genus Nonia. It was described by Ragonot in 1888, and is known from Panama and Colombia.

References

Moths described in 1888
Moths of South America
Moths of Central America
Phycitinae
Taxa named by Émile Louis Ragonot